Hazar Motan (born 13 December 1990) is a Turkish actress, model and painter. She is known for her role as Cemre in drama series Kırgın Çiçekler, Hande Tekin in Can Kırıkları and Findik Hatçe in Kanunsuz Topraklar.

Life 
 She studied at Bilkent University, School of Fine Arts. She started her career in 1997 as a child actress with a role in the movie Yanlış Saksının Çiçeği. In 2004, she was cast in the short movie Damatlık Şapka, portraying the character of Güllü. In 2014, she joined the cast of Diğer Yarım. Her breakthrough came in 2015, with a leading role in the teen drama Kırgın Çiçekler as Cemre.

Filmography

References

External links 
 
 

1990 births
Living people
Turkish child actresses
Turkish television actresses
Turkish film actresses
Actresses from Ankara